Star Wars: Brotherhood is a Star Wars novel by Mike Chen that was published by Del Rey Books. It was released in hardcover, Ebook, and audiobook on May 10, 2022, and will be released in paperback on May 16, 2023.

See also
 List of Star Wars books, the list of novels published in the Star Wars series

References

Novels based on Star Wars
2022 American novels
2022 science fiction novels
Del Rey books